William Mallinson may refer to:

William Mallinson (auctioneer), involved with the Sugarman Gang
Sir William Mallinson, 1st Baronet (1854–1936) of the Mallinson Baronets
Sir William James Mallinson, 2nd Baronet (1879–1944) of the Mallinson Baronets
Sir (William) Paul Mallinson, 3rd Baronet (1909–1989) of the Mallinson Baronets
Sir William John Mallinson, 4th Baronet (1942–1995) of the Mallinson Baronets
Sir (William) James Mallinson, 5th Baronet (b. 1970) of the Mallinson Baronets